2012 Arnold Classic 22nd

Simon Johnston (born 27 November 1982) is a strongman and weightlifter from Wales.

References

1982 births
Living people
Welsh strength athletes
Welsh male weightlifters